Noir Désir, a French rock group, have released six studio albums, thirteen singles, two live albums, one live DVD, four compilation albums, and one remix album.

In 1985 Noir Désir were signed up by Barclay Records, releasing the mini-album Ou veux-tu que je r'garde two years later. In 1989 they had a break through success with their debut full length album Veuillez rendre l'âme (à qui elle appartient), which contained the hit single Aux sombres héros de l'amer.  They went on to release the less successful album  Du ciment sous les plaines in 1991, but in 1992 Tostaky gained enormous critical acclaim and was a commercial hit as well.

In 1994 the group released their first live album Dies Irae.  In 1996 they released the very successful 666.667 Club which was certified double platinum and  has sold over a million copies.  The group released an album of remixes of their work in 1998 and then in September 2001 released their sixth studio album Des visages des figures, selling over a million copies and taking only two months to go double platinum.  They released a second live album and a live DVD in 2005, Noir Désir En Public and Noir Désir En Images respectively.

Studio albums

Live recordings

Compilation albums

Singles

References

External links 
 Official Site

Discographies of French artists
Rock music group discographies